Jerusalem Countdown is a 2011 Christian thriller film adapted from the speculative fiction novel of the same name  by John Hagee. It was directed and co-written by Harold Cronk and stars David A.R. White, Anna Zielinski, Randy Travis, Lee Majors, Stacy Keach, and Marco Khan.

Plot 
As negotiations take place in the United States regarding Israel, senior FBI agent Shane Daughtry (David A. R. White) is contacted by Arlin Rockwell (Lee Majors), an arms dealer. Rockwell informs Daughtry of his role in an operation known as "Seven Wonders". Before he can reveal what it is, Rockwell is abruptly murdered by Nick Tanner (Matthew Tailford), a terrorist assassin. Daughtry pursues and manages to apprehend Tanner.

Meanwhile, agent Eve Rearden (Anna Zielinski) meets with her father Jackson (Stacy Keach), who tries to warn her of the negotiations inevitable disastrous results. She ignores him and leaves.

Rearden later meets with Daughtry, who she had a falling out with after an operation gone wrong. After some investigating, they discover that the "Sevens Wonders" are actually nuclear warheads that have been smuggled into the country. They learn that the bombs are intended to cripple the United States and leave Israel vulnerable to attack.

After interrogating Tanner, Daughtry learns that an organization known as the "Revolution of God" is behind the conspiracy. They take this information to Jack (Randy Travis), a CIA officer. Jack informs them that the "Revolution of God" is an alleged group of world leaders who plan to dominate the world. They also learn that Matthew Dean (Nick Jameson), a former CIA agent, is also working for the organization. Jack refuses to tell them anything else, leaving Daughtry suspicious.

After interrogating Tanner again, they learn that the organization intends to assassinate the visiting Israeli Prime Minister. Rearden leaves to protect the Prime Minister, while Daughtry goes to Chicago, where he has learned the bombs are being kept.

Dean infiltrates the airport the Prime Minister is leaving from, and plants a bomb on the plane. Rearden spots Dean, however, after a shootout, the bomb is detonated, killing the Prime Minister.

Upon arriving in Chicago, Daughtry is informed that the nukes are being kept in a suburban neighborhood. Daniel, a local resident who had grown suspicious of the homes' occupants, helps Daughtry defeat the terrorists and stop the bombs from being detonated.

Dean contacts his superior, who berates him for the failed operation. He is then killed by Tanner, who had earlier escaped FBI custody. Tanner takes Dean's phone and speaks to the leader, who is revealed to be Jack. Jack then tells him to await further orders, and Tanner sets off a bomb which destroys Dean's vehicle.

Back in Chicago, Daughtry contacts Rearden, and hopes to find Dean. Suddenly, however, an earthquake occurs, and the sky turns red. Then, the Rapture occurs, taking all Christians, including Jackson and Daniel, off the earth. Rearden laments not listening to her father, and fears for the future. Daughtry then departs to save Rearden as the city quickly descends into chaos.

Cast

Soundtrack 
The soundtrack was written by Jeehun Hwang.

Reception 

Several reviewers complained about character development that leads nowhere and excessive attention lavished on newscasts pertaining to negotiations in Israel, the importance of these issues characters might be revisited in a sequel. Victor Medina's review for Cinelix mentions an additional nine cut scenes from the Blu-ray, that would have provided more character development, but would have also slowed down the action. For this type of film, Jerusalem Countdown includes better than average performances, a fair degree of filmmaking craft, but some rote and cliché ridden writing.

References

External links 
 Website
 
 
 

2011 films
American action thriller films
Films directed by Harold Cronk
10 West Studios films
Films about the rapture
Pure Flix Entertainment films
Films shot in Michigan
Films shot in Los Angeles
Films based on American novels
Films produced by David A. R. White
Films about the Federal Bureau of Investigation
Films about assassinations
Films set in Chicago
Films with screenplays by David A. R. White
2011 directorial debut films
2010s English-language films
2010s American films